Sungai Guntung, sometimes referred to as Sei Guntung and administratively the kelurahan of Tagaraja, is an Indonesian port town in Indragiri Hilir Regency, Riau with a population of over 14,000 in 2016.

Located across the mouth of the Guntung River, the town sits on the island of Kateman which is separated by a narrow channel from the eastern coast of Sumatra.

Geography
Sungai Guntung is located at the western side of Kateman Island (Indonesian: Pulau Kateman), with the coordinates of 0°17'44" N and 103°36'41" E. Administratively, it is part and the seat of Kateman Subdistrict, itself part of the Indragiri Hilir Regency. The kelurahan covers an area of 29.73 square kilometers.

Demographics
The population of Sungai Guntung according to Statistics Indonesia estimates were 14,088 in 2016.

References

Populated places in Riau
Port cities and towns in Indonesia